Anouar Diba (Riffian-Berber: ⴰⵏⵡⴰⵔ ⴷⵉⴱⴰ, born 27 February 1983 in Utrecht, the Netherlands) is a Dutch-Moroccan former footballer.

Club career
Diba is a forward who was made his debut in professional football during the 2002–03 season, being part of the NAC Breda squad. He spent five seasons with NAC in the Dutch Eredivisie and had a short spell at FC Twente in 2010.

In the winter of 2011, after sustaining a leg injury, Diba had to be treated in London, subsequently missing much of the league matches of his then-new club, Lekhwiya. As a result, Diba was cut from the squad. While numerous news outlets had reported Diba's departure, he himself had not received any official confirmation of being released by the club officials, and was first informed after receiving calls from his agent and friends. Before Diba's trip to London, Lekhwiya coach Djamel Belmadi had claimed Diba was one of the most prominent professionals in the team. This came as a surprise to Diba, as he was just 2–3 weeks from being released from the hospital.

On 22 January 2012, Diba joined Al-Wakrah, signing a contract until the end of the season.

International career
He made his debut for Morocco in a November 2006 friendly match against Gabon.

References

External links
 
 Anouar Diba Interview

1983 births
Living people
Footballers from Utrecht (city)
Dutch sportspeople of Moroccan descent
Riffian people
Association football forwards
Dutch footballers
Moroccan footballers
Morocco international footballers
USV Elinkwijk players
NAC Breda players
Al-Wakrah SC players
Al-Nasr SC (Dubai) players
FC Twente players
Lekhwiya SC players
Al Kharaitiyat SC players
Eredivisie players
Qatar Stars League players
Dutch expatriate footballers
Expatriate footballers in Qatar
Expatriate footballers in the United Arab Emirates
Dutch expatriate sportspeople in Qatar
Dutch expatriate sportspeople in the United Arab Emirates
UAE Pro League players